Gloria Manzoni (born 25 April 1998) is an Italian road and track cyclist, who last rode for UCI Women's Team . Representing Italy at international competitions, Manzoni competed at the 2016 UEC European Track Championships in the 500m time trial event and team sprint event.

Major results
2016
 Trofeu Ciutat de Barcelona
3rd Keirin
3rd Sprint

References

External links

1998 births
Living people
Italian female cyclists
Italian track cyclists
Place of birth missing (living people)